Kalaycı is a village in the Amasra District, Bartın Province, Turkey. Its population is 167 (2021).

History 
Village, places with the same name since 1928.

Geography 
The village is 35 km from Bartın city and 20 km from Amasra town.

References

Villages in Amasra District